Snowflake Unified School District 5 is a school district in Navajo County, Arizona.

Schools
The District includes the following schools:

 Snowflake High School (grades 9–12)
 Snowflake Junior High (grades 7 and 8)
 Snowflake Intermediate School (grades 4–6)
 Taylor Intermediate School (grades 4–6)
 Highland Primary School (grades K-3)
 Taylor Elementary School (grades K-3)

References

External links
 

School districts in Navajo County, Arizona